Jonathan Davies (born 5 April 1988) is a Welsh professional rugby union player who plays at centre for the Scarlets and the Wales national team. He is commonly known as "Fox", differentiating him from the Jonathan Davies who played both rugby union and rugby league during the 1980s and 1990s. His brother is James Davies, who also played professional rugby for Wales as a flanker.

Early life
Born to Welsh parents in Solihull, England, Davies moved at a young age with his family to Bancyfelin, Carmarthenshire, where his parents ran the Fox & Hounds Pub; Davies is nicknamed "Fox" after the pub. He attended Dyffryn Taf Comprehensive School in Whitland, Carmarthenshire, and is a fluent Welsh speaker. Davies studied Sports and Exercise course at Trinity College, Carmarthen.

Club career
Davies started his career playing age-grade rugby for Llanelli RFC. He made his senior professional debut for the Llanelli Scarlets region before his first appearance for the senior Llanelli club side, playing against Northampton Saints on 11 August 2006. However, it took him until his sixth appearance (more than a year later) to score his first try, as he touched down against Connacht on 28 September 2007.

On 12 November 2013, Davies signed for French club Clermont Auvergne in the Top 14 on a two-year deal.

On 13 November 2015, Davies returned to Scarlets from Clermont Auvergne on a national dual contract with the Welsh Rugby Union.

International career

Wales
In 2009, Davies received his first call-up to the Welsh senior team for their mid-year tour of North America. He made his international debut in the first game of the tour, starting at outside centre against Canada on 30 May 2009. He also played in the match against the United States, and scored two tries.

For this performance and his form for the Scarlets, Davies was one of four Scarlets included in Wales's 29-man squad for the 2009 Autumn internationals. After being named as an unused substitute for the New Zealand game on 7 November, Davies was again named on the bench against Samoa on 13 November, taking the place of the injured Tom Shanklin after 49 minutes. With Shanklin injured, Davies was picked to partner Jamie Roberts at inside centre against Argentina on 21 November. Although Wales won the match 33–16, it was an error from Davies that led to Argentina's only try; Davies attempted to kick the ball forward, but it cannoned off the legs of his opposite number, Martín Rodríguez, who gathered the ball and took it back in himself for the try. Nevertheless, Davies and Roberts formed a solid partnership in the middle of the field for the majority of the game, and Argentina were otherwise limited to penalty goals. Despite his error, Davies retained the number 12 jersey for the final match of the series against Australia, although an injury to winger Leigh Halfpenny within the first 30 minutes meant that Davies spent the majority of the game playing out of position on the right wing; Wales lost the match 33–12.

On 18 January 2010, Davies was named in the 35-man Wales squad for the 2010 Six Nations tournament. However, he was not named in the 22-man squad for any of Wales's five matches in the competition. He returned to the Wales team on their summer tour of New Zealand, coming on as a substitute for Jamie Roberts for the last 10 minutes of the first Test on 19 June. An injury to Andrew Bishop prior to the second Test the following weekend saw Davies and Roberts renew their centre partnership, though this time Davies occupied the outside position. Davies spearheaded one of Wales's best attacks of the game, but attempted to go solo for the goal line instead of offloading to one of three supporting runners with the line at their mercy.

On 21 October 2010, Davies was again named in the Wales squad for the Autumn international series, but he was preferred for each of the games by a combination of James Hook, Tom Shanklin and Andrew Bishop.

Following a 2011 6-Nations series in which Davies returned as a starting centre, he was named in Wales's preliminary World Cup squad. Davies completed both infamous training camps in Spala, Poland and was subsequently named as one of four centres. He started in all three of the side's pre-tournament tests against England, home and away, and Argentina at home.

During the 2011 World Cup Davies played a part in every Welsh game from the opening fixture against South Africa through to their third-place play-off defeat by Australia, forming a formidable centre partnership with Jamie Roberts.

Davies returned to the Scarlets squad in time for their opening Heineken Cup pool game against Castres. Enjoying a successful 2011 with both region and country, Davies rose to international status through the ranks of quality Welsh centres.

In 2012 Davies was a member of the Wales team which won the Championship, achieving their third Grand Slam in eight tournaments.

Lions
Davies was selected to play for the 2013 British & Irish Lions tour to Australia. He was controversially selected in the third test ahead of Brian O'Driscoll in what would have been O'Driscoll's last appearance for the British & Irish Lions. The Lions won the third test convincingly.

Davies was again selected to play on the 2017 Lions tour of New Zealand. He was voted player of the series by his Lions team-mates.

International tries

Playing style
Davies has an all-round game including opportunistic try scoring, kicking and physical presence, but he is particularly valued for his defensive marshalling and protection of the 13 channel, including remaining linked with his defensive colleagues, and occasional spot-blitzing.

Personal life
Davies' brother James also plays rugby. Davies is married. Davies supports Manchester United and is a fan of Tom Brady.

Awards
On 5 August 2019, Davies was inducted into the Gorsedd of Bards at the National Eisteddfod of Wales in Llanrwst. He will use the name "Jon Cadno", in reference to his nickname.

References

External links

1988 births
Living people
ASM Clermont Auvergne players
Bards of the Gorsedd
British & Irish Lions rugby union players from Wales
Rugby union centres
Rugby union players from Solihull
Scarlets players
Wales international rugby union players
Welsh rugby union players